The John Covington Moore House is a historic house in rural Clay County, North Carolina. The -story log structure was built c. 1838 by John C. Moore, not long after the forced removal of the Cherokee from the area. The building is mounted on fieldstone piers, and has a porch extending across its front. There are shed-roofed rooms across the back of the house, and an exterior chimney at one end.

John C. Moore is acknowledged as Clay County's first white settler.  He began homesteading in the area as early as 1833, and claimed the land around this house after the Cherokee removal.  He was one of Clay County's first commissioners.

The house was listed on the National Register of Historic Places in 1983.

See also
National Register of Historic Places listings in Clay County, North Carolina

References

Houses on the National Register of Historic Places in North Carolina
Houses completed in 1838
Houses in Clay County, North Carolina
National Register of Historic Places in Clay County, North Carolina